Tulsequah is an unincorporated locality in northwestern, British Columbia, Canada, located at the confluence of the Taku and Tulsequah Rivers.  The Tulsequah Chief Mine is located nearby, about ten miles up the Tulsequah River.

References

Unincorporated settlements in British Columbia
Atlin District
Mining communities in British Columbia